Pantelis Antoniadis (born 23 March 1994) is a Greek midfielder currently playing for Kalamata. He plays as a midfielder and came up through the club's youth ranks.

Club career

Aris
He started his career in youth teams of Aris. During the 2012–2013 season, head coach Makis Katsavakis promoted him to the first team, being a member of Greece U19 team.

References

External links
Myplayer.gr Profile

1994 births
Living people
Aris Thessaloniki F.C. players
Super League Greece players
Greek footballers
Association football midfielders
Footballers from Thessaloniki